Charles Baldwin may refer to:

Charles Baldwin (MP) (1593–?), English politician
Charles Baldwin (cricketer) (1864–1947), English cricketer
Charles C. Baldwin (born 1947), former Chief of Chaplains of the United States Air Force
Charles F. Baldwin, former U.S. Ambassador to Malaysia
Charles H. Baldwin (admiral) (1822–1888), American rear admiral in United States Navy
Charles H. Baldwin (Medal of Honor) (1839–1911), American sailor on the USS Wyalusing
Charles Sears Baldwin (1867–1935), American scholar and professor of rhetoric at Yale University
Chuck Baldwin (born 1952), American 2008 Constitution Party presidential candidate from Florida
Charles Barry Baldwin (1789–1859), British politician
Charles C. P. Baldwin (1812–1893), government official in Vermont